The Air Force Board of the Defence Council is responsible for the management of the Royal Air Force.

Prior to the creation of the current UK Ministry of Defence in 1964, the administration of the RAF and its personnel was undertaken by the Air Force Council, part of the Air Ministry. In 1964, the Defence Council took over this role, but the day-to-day management of the three services was delegated to the three single service boards, of which the Air Force Board is one.

Membership of the Board
The composition is as follows:
Civilian
 Secretary of State for Defence
 Minister of State for the Armed Forces
 Minister for Defence Equipment, Support and Technology
 Minister for Defence Personnel, Welfare and Veterans
Director of Resources
Royal Air Force
Chief of the Air Staff
 Deputy Commander Capability / Air Member for Personnel
 Deputy Commander Operations
 Assistant Chief of the Air Staff
Royal Navy
 Chief of Materiel (Air) / Air Member for Materiel

See also
Army Board
Admiralty Board (United Kingdom)

Notes and references

Royal Air Force
Ministry of Defence (United Kingdom)